Novi Bračin is a village in the municipality of Ražanj, Serbia. According to the 2002 census, the village has a population of 568 people. During the Roman Empire the  village name was Praesidium Dasmini.

References

Populated places in Nišava District